Martin Hačecký (born 24 July 1988) is a Czech former professional road cyclist.

Major results
2006
 1st  Time trial, Junior National Road Championships
 1st Overall Peace Race Juniors
 4th Overall Grand Prix Rüebliland
2007
 3rd Prague–Karlovy Vary–Prague
2010
 8th Prague–Karlovy Vary–Prague
2012
 1st Grand Prix Kralovehradeckeho kraje

References

External links

1988 births
Living people
Czech male cyclists
Sportspeople from Prague